The Society of American Florists (SAF) is a national US Trade Association representing floristry in the United States (US). Retailers, growers, wholesalers, importers, manufacturers, suppliers, educators, students and allied organizations are members.

Mission statement
The Society of American Florists provides marketing, government advocacy, industry intelligence and best practices information for participants in the US floral industry.

Boards and councils
The volunteer leaders of SAF serve on a number of Councils and Committees.

Board of Directors
The SAF Board of Directors makes key decisions that provide the guidance for SAF programs. It is composed of an Executive Committee and Board of Directors. The current Chairperson is Bill LaFever, PFCI. The President is Chris Drummond, AAF, PFCI. The  Executive Vice President and CEO is Kate F. Penn.

Growers Council
The Growers Council represents the needs of the grower industry segment within the Society of American Florists. The current Chairperson is Jamie Kitz, AAF.

Retailers Council
The Retailers Council represents the needs of the retailer industry segment within the Society of American Florists. The current Chairperson is Kaitlin Radebaugh, AAF.

Wholesalers Council
The Wholesalers Council represents the needs of the wholesale industry segment within the Society of American Florists. The current Chairperson is Oscar Fernandez.

Other Joint Councils & Committees
Awards Committee, Consumer Joint Council, Convention Task Force, Government Joint Council, Member Joint Council, PFCI Board of Trustees

Events and education

SAF offers florists a number of professional development programs and related events that provide education and networking opportunities.

Annual convention
Each year SAF holds an annual convention, usually in August or July, that lasts several days and includes educational programs covering all aspects of the floral industry.

Congressional Action Days
Each year in March, SAF members come to Washington, U.S. to learn more about the state of the industry.

1 – Day Profit Blast
This relatively new format brings four sessions in a single day to different cities throughout the US.

Certifications
SAF offers two different certifications for achievement in and contribution to the floral industry.

American Academy of Floriculture (AAF)
AAF certification recognizes industry members who meet the highest standards of service to the floral industry and their communities. Established in 1965, nomination and acceptance into the Academy is open to qualified persons in all segments of the industry. AAF members include retailers, wholesalers, growers, educators, scientists, designers and more.

Professional Floral Communicators – International (PFCI)
PFCI is awarded to the best floral educators in the industry. PFCI are accepted only after a rigorous screening process and peer review, and are able to speak authoritatively about industry topics such as principles and elements of Floral Design, care and handling of flowers and plants, and effective business management techniques.

Membership
SAF recognizes and welcomes four main types of member: Retail Florists, Growers, Wholesalers/Importers and Suppliers. There are also additional categories for students, educators state floral associations and independent designers. Fees depend on segment and annual revenue.

References

External links 
The Society of American Florists (SAF)

Professional associations based in the United States
Floral organizations